Shamanka is a rural locality (a settlement) in Kurumkansky District, Republic of Buryatia, Russia. The population was 192 as of 2010. There are 3 streets.

Geography 
Shamanka is located 20 km northeast of Kurumkan (the district's administrative centre) by road. Sakhuli is the nearest rural locality.

References 

Rural localities in Kurumkansky District